Monogram is an American brand and former manufacturing company of scale plastic models of cars, aircraft, spacecraft, ships, and military vehicles since the early 1950s. The company was formed by two former employees of Comet Kits, Jack Besser and Bob Reder. 

Mattel acquired Monogram in 1968, and the firm passed through various owners and was merged with Revell, the combined company being bought by Hobbico in 2007. Along with Revell, AMT, and MPC, Monogram is sometimes called one of the traditional "Big 4" in plastic modeling.

History 
Monogram was founded in Chicago in 1945, making balsa wood model kits of ships and airplanes. Seaships such as the USS Missouri battleship, the USS Shangri-La carrier and the USS Hobby destroyer were among the first products. Meanwhile, a company called Revell started making plastic kits in 1953, and Monogram responded with "All Plastic" "Plastikits" the first of which were a red plastic midget racer and a "Hot Rod" Model A - and the modeling race was on. These two cars, and later an Indianapolis-style racer and hydroplane racing boat, were also offered with CO2 "Jet Power". Early kits advertised that the models were made from "acetate parts molded to shape". The wording showed the newness of the plastics industry and how plastics were not yet being taken for granted.

Early airplane models were mainly balsa wood, but more plastic parts were added over the next couple of years. By 1954 the airplane lineup consisted of the "Speedee Built" series which flew under rubber band power. A few of these planes were all-plastic. Also seen were the Superkits with a prefabricated balsa fuselage, but more plastic parts.

Auto kit makers AMT and Jo-Han started early but focused on manufacturers' promotional models and did not enter the kit fray until the late 1950s. As the 1950s progressed, Monogram increasingly included more automobile models and custom wheeled creations in competition with the other makers. Through the 1970s, competition required increased production of a variety of fantastical vehicles.

The Monogram approach
By the late 1950s, the company moved steadily into the car scene, especially with its hot rods and race cars. In 1956 it released a Model A V-8 rod and a Sprint Car, two of its first car kits. In 1959, Monogram issued its 1932 Ford Deuce 5 window coupe. One 1962 kit, however, showed the company's prowess and intent - the "Big T" (kit PC 78). This was a huge 1/8 scale 1924 Ford Model T bucket, complete with hot-rodded Chevy engine. The 24-page 8 1/2 x 11 inch instruction booklet showed that the model came with an optional electric motor to power the wheels, and featured customizing tips by Darryl Starbird, the famous Kansas customizer. The manual also shows how sophisticated the company's catering was toward hot rod culture - long before Hot Wheels or the Detroit muscle car craze.

Competition
As the 1960s progressed, Monogram and Revell squared off as rivals in the scale model market. While companies like AMT and MPC focused almost exclusively on cars, Monogram and Revell were more diversified, offering aircraft, naval craft and other military vehicles. Monogram aircraft kits were known for imaginative "operating features", such as a spring-loaded ejection seats on their F-105 Thunderchief model (operated by a tiny plastic tab on the side of the plane), and a tactical nuclear bomb which could be dropped from the RB-66A model - which also featured a moving tailgun turret.

In the 1970s, Monogram wanted to portray a different perspective of its kits and add some spark to sales. 'Make it large' was one marketing approach that the company returned to. For example, Monogram introduced a 1978 Corvette kit in 1:8 scale - when assembled it was over 23 inches long. Examples of vintage auto offerings were a 1930s Rolls-Royce Cabriolet with rumble seat, a 1930s Packard Phaeton, and a 1941 Lincoln Continental. The company's Early Iron series featured variants of Ford Model As. During the 1970s, the company also hired modeler Sheperd Paine to construct and paint aircraft models and dioramas, which were used for photographs on boxes and instruction booklets. Some metal kits, like a 1953 Corvette, also appeared.

Daniel hot rods and customs 
While Revell carried many foreign cars and AMT and MPC handled the promo markets (and so moved forward with mostly American car brands), Monogram's emphasis was on aircraft and military vehicles. In the 1970s, however, Monogram started to focus more on hot rods and customs and, in 1961, was the first company to hire a well-known automobile stylist, when Darryl Starbird was brought on board. Similarly, AMT hired customizers George Barris, the Alexander Brothers, and Bill Cushenbery, and MPC had Dean Jeffries. In 1968, Monogram then hired stylist Tom Daniel who designed more than 80 fantastical vehicles, not always based on real cars.

When the company was bought by Mattel in 1968, custom vehicles designed by Daniel and others were seen in both small and large sizes in Hot Wheels diecast - and then in Monogram kit form. Examples seen in both Hot Wheels and Monogram venues were the Ice-T, the Red Baron, the Paddy Wagon, the S'cool Bus, the Sand Crab, and the T'rantula (even made by Mattel subsidiary Mebetoys of Italy). Some of the handsomest vehicles were the simpler rods, like the "Son of Ford" '32 Ford rod and the "Boss 'A' Bone", a rodded '29 Model A pickup. Models of later vehicles were also common in this series, like the sleek "Street Fighter", a Daniel-designed '60 Chevy panel truck powered by a Camaro Z/28 engine (Quicksilver was another variation of the same kit), and the 1955 Chevrolet Bad Man gasser. By around 1970, many of these models were molded in bright reds and oranges and did not require painting.

Monogram offered a variety of more official race cars as well, again often leaving foreign vehicles to Revell which had established a Germany subsidiary.  Monogram examples were Tom McEwan's Duster funny car, and its rival the Plymouth Barracuda driven by Don Prudhomme. Of course, both were offered by Mattel as Hot Wheels.

Many changes of hands
In 1984 Mattel divested itself of many companies not associated with its traditional toy industries. In 1986, Monogram was bought by Odyssey Partners, a New York private equity firm. Later that same summer, Odyssey purchased Revell Models of Venice, California. Subsequently, Odyssey Partners merged Revell with Monogram and moved all its usable assets to Monogram's Des Plaines, Illinois Plant Number 2. After Revell was merged with Monogram, company headquarters was moved a short distance to Northbrook, Illinois.

In the early 1990s, Revell-Monogram embarked on an experiment that tried to match historic modeling logos with a CD-Rom racing car game. After investing nearly $4 million, customers had trouble distinguishing model from game and the project was scrapped after only 50,000 were sold (Wallace 1994). Also in the early 1990s, Monogram sold their 1/87 Mini Exacts HO series to Herpa, where some of the models continue to be sold even today. One difference from the normal Herpa models was a metal chassis.

In 1994 Revell-Monogram was purchased by Hallmark Cards as part of its Binney and Smith division (the owners of famous Crayola crayons). This relationship lasted for thirteen years.

In May 2007, Hobbico Inc., the radio control airplane maker, announced the acquisition of Revell-Monogram LLC. From 1987 to 2005 the Monogram logo had appeared underneath that of Revell, but since the Hobbico acquisition, the Monogram name has disappeared. Now the Revell logo stands alone as Hobbico renamed the subsidiary the Revell Group, which consists of both revered names (the Revell-Monogram webpage has a graphic progression of the development of the two companies' logos going back to 1945). Concerning plastic kits, Hobbico also owns Estes, and is the exclusive distributor of Hasegawa, as seen on their company websites.

Hobbico declared bankruptcy on June 30, 2018 and went into liquidation.

Product range 
Monogram was a prolific model producer.  The following lists of kits are definitely not all-inclusive:

Aircraft
Japan 1/48 scale
 Mitsubishi A6M

Germany 1/48 scale
 Arado Ar 234, Dornier Do 335, Focke-Wulf Fw 190, Heinkel He 111, Junkers Ju 87G Stuka, Junkers Ju 88, Junkers Ju 52, Messerschmitt Bf 109, Messerschmitt Me 262

United States 1/48 scale

 Bell P-39 Airacobra
 Bell UH-1 Huey 
 Bell AH-1S Cobra
 Boeing B-17 Flying Fortress
 Boeing B-29 Superfortress
 Boeing AH-64 Apache
 Cessna A-37 Dragonfly
 Cessna 180 
 Convair F-102A Delta Dagger
 Convair F-106 Delta Dart
 Convair B-58 Hustler
 Consolidated B-24 Liberator
 Consolidated PBY Catalina
 Curtiss P-40C Hawk
 Curtiss SB2C Helldiver
 Douglas DC-3
 Douglas C-47 Skytrain
 Douglas TBD Devastator
 Douglas SBD Dauntless
 Douglas A-26 Invader
 Douglas A-1 Skyraider
 Douglas A-4 Skyhawk 
 General Dynamics F-16 Fighting Falcon
 General Dynamics F-111 
 Grumman TBF Avenger
 Grumman F4F Wildcat
 Grumman F6F Hellcat
 Grumman F-14 Tomcat
 Lockheed P-38 Lightning
 Lockheed P-80 Shooting Star
 Lockheed F-104 Starfighter
 LTV A-7 Corsair II
 Martin B-26 Marauder
 McDonnell F-101B Voodoo
 McDonnell-Douglas F-4 Phantom II
 McDonnell-Douglas AV-8B Harrier II
 McDonnell Douglas F-15 Eagle
 McDonnell-Douglas F/A-18 Hornet
 North American AT-6 Texan
 North American T-28 Trojan
 North American B-25 Mitchell
 North American P-51 Mustang 
 North American F-86 Sabre
 North American F-100 Super Sabre
 Northrop P-61 Black Widow
 Northrop F-5E Tiger II
 Northrop F-20 Tigershark
 Northrop F-89 Scorpion
 Piper PA-20 Pacer
 Republic P-47 Thunderbolt
 Republic F-84F Thunderstreak
 Republic F-105 Thunderchief
 Vought OS2U Kingfisher
 Vought F4U Corsair
 Vought F-8 Crusader

United Kingdom 1/48 scale

de Havilland Mosquito
 Hawker Hurricane
 Hawker Typhoon
 Supermarine Spitfire

Cars
1/8 scale
 1985 Corvette Coupe, kit #2608
1/24 scale classics
 1934 Duesenberg SJ, 1939 Mercedes 540K, 1941 Lincoln Continental, Cord 812
1/24 scale contemporary
 1957 Chevy Hardtop
 1965 Chevy Impala SS 396

1/87 scale Mini-Exacts

 Ferrari F40
 1969 Ford Mustang Boss 302
 1957 Chevrolet
 Ferrari Testarossa
 Lamborghini Countach
 Jaguar XK-E.
 1989 Pontiac Grand Prix
 BMW 325 coupe
 Mercedes-Benz 300 SL Gullwing
 1963 Corvette Split Window
 1966 Shelby 427 Cobra
 1962 Ferrari 250 GTO
 1987 Z-28 Camaro
 1990 Corvette ZR-1
 1989 Ford Thunderbird SC
 Porsche 911 slant nose
 Mazda RX-7 
 1987 Buick Grand National, and
 Limited edition Indy Car and NASCAR Chevy Lumina.

Armor
1/32 scale

 M8 Greyhound Armored Car
 M20 Armored Car
 M3 Lee Medium Tank
 M3 Grant Medium Tank
 M4 Sherman Hedgehog
 Walker Bulldog
 M4A1 Sherman Screaming Mimi
 M48A2 Patton Tank
 Sd.Kfz. 232 Panzerspähwagen 8-Rad Armored Car
 Panzerkampfwagen IV Medium Tank
 Sturmgeschütz IV Assault Tank
 Panzerjäger IV L/70 Tank Destroyer
 Sturmpanzer IV Brumbär
 Flakpanzer IV Wirbelwind
 Flakpanzer IV Ostwind
 2 1/2 ton truck
 US Jeep
 M3 personal carrier 1/2 track
 M 16 Half Track

Notes

References

 

Model manufacturers of the United States
1:25 scale models
Scale model scales
Elk Grove Village, Illinois